Elachista eskoi is a moth of the family Elachistidae. It is found in Great Britain, Denmark, Fennoscandia and the Baltic region.

Adults are on wing in early morning and late evening.

References

External links
 Elachista eskoi sp. n., a new species of Elachistidae from Finland (Lepidoptera)

eskoi
Moths described in 1985
Moths of Europe